This is a list of properties and districts in Brantley County, Georgia that are listed on the National Register of Historic Places (NRHP).

Current listings

|}

References

Brantley
Brantley County, Georgia
National Register of Historic Places in Brantley County, Georgia